Platycheirus clypeatus is a species of hoverfly. It is found across the Palearctic and in the Nearctic. The larvae feed on aphids. Adults are usually found on the edges of woodland or scrub, heath or along hedgerows where they visit a wide range of flowers.

Description
External images
Femorae 1 has posterior hairs extending almost to apex. Tarsae 1 and 2 are orange. Face has eye margins almost parallel from level of antennal insertions to the lower margin of facial prominence.
For unknown terms, see: Morphology of Diptera.See references for determination.

Image links 
For additional information, see these images.

Distribution
Palearctic: Fennoscandia
south to Iberia and the Mediterranean basin, Ireland east through Europe into Turkey and European Russia and then from the Urals to central Siberia. Nearctic: Alaska to Ontario and south to California.

Biology
Habitat: grassland and fen, margins of ponds, streams, bogs and lakes, wet ditches and canals. It flies April to September.

References

Syrphinae
Insects described in 1822
Diptera of Europe